Marriage is a lost 1927 American silent drama film directed by Roy William Neill and written by Gertrude Orr and Elizabeth Pickett Chevalier. It is based on the 1912 novel Marriage by H. G. Wells. The film stars Virginia Valli, Allan Durant, Gladys McConnell, Lawford Davidson, Donald Stuart, and Frank Dunn. The film was released on February 13, 1927, by Fox Film Corporation.

Cast

References

External links
 

1927 films
1920s English-language films
Silent American drama films
1927 drama films
Fox Film films
Films directed by Roy William Neill
American silent feature films
American black-and-white films
Films based on British novels
1920s American films